Cristian Rodríguez (born 1985) is a Uruguayan footballer.

Cristian Rodríguez may also refer to:
Cristian Rodríguez (boxer) (born 1973), Argentine boxer
Cristian Rodríguez (tennis) (born 1990), Colombian tennis player
Cristián Rodríguez (cyclist) (born 1995), Spanish cyclist
Cristian Rodríguez (footballer, born 1996), Spanish footballer

See also
Christian Rodriguez (born 1995), Salvadoran footballer
Cristina Rodríguez (disambiguation)